The Ministry of Foreign Affairs of Czechoslovakia refers to the foreign affairs ministry which was responsible for representing internationally Czechoslovakia during its existence, from 1918 to 1992.

List of ministers

First Czechoslovak Republic (1918–1938)

Second Czechoslovak Republic (1938–1939)

Czechoslovak government-in-exile (1940–1945)

Third Czechoslovak Republic (1945–1948)

Czechoslovak Socialist Republic (1948–1989)

Czech and Slovak Federative Republic (1989–1992)

See also
Ministry of Foreign Affairs (Czech Republic)
Minister of Foreign Affairs (Czech Republic)
Ministry of Foreign Affairs (Slovakia)
Minister of Foreign Affairs (Slovakia)

External links
Czechoslovak ministries, etc – Rulers.org

Foreign ministers of Czechoslovakia
Czechoslovakia
Foreign relations of Czechoslovakia
1918 establishments in Czechoslovakia
1992 disestablishments in Czechoslovakia